Garage Swim is a garage rock compilation album released by Adult Swim in 2013. The album was released as a free download on their website. It was presented and sponsored by Dr. Pepper.

Track listing
 Bass Drum of Death – "Dregs" (3:09)	
 Apache Dropout – "Constant Plaything" (3:59)	
 Thee Oh Sees – "Devil Again" (2:48)	
 King Tuff feat. Gap Dream – "She's On Fire" (3:32)	
 JEFF the Brotherhood – "Melting Place" (3:16)	
 Black Lips – "Cruising" (2:41)	
 King Khan and Gris Gris – "Discrete Disguise" (4:17)	
 Mikal Cronin – "Better Man" (4:48)	
 Mind Spiders – "They Lie" (2:30)	
 Cheap Time – "Kill The Light" (3:05)	
 King Louie's Missing Monuments – "Covered In Ice" (3:05)	
 OBN Ills – "A Good Lover" (4:17)	
 The Gories – "On The Run" (2:09)	
 King Khan – "Strange Ways" (3:33)	
 Weekend – "Teal Kia" (Demo) (5:43)

References

Albums free for download by copyright owner
Williams Street Records compilation albums
2013 albums